Dance All Night is the debut studio album by American singer XL. The entire album was written by Truesdell and produced by Dem Jointz.

Singles
"Walk Away (Get To Know Me)" was released as the album's lead single on March 20, 2011. The second single, "Dance All Night", was released in May 2012. "Tonight" was released as the album's third single in the fall of 2012. It became the album's most successful single, peaking in the top 100 on the ReverbNation R&B/Soul chart.

Track listing

Personnel
Credits for Dance All Night adapted from BMI.
Dem Jointz - composer, executive producer, writer, engineer, mixing, mastering
F. Millionaire - performer
Xavier Lamar Truesdell - art direction, co-producer, writer

Music video
"Dance All Night" music video was released on YouTube on May 24, 2011 and was directed by Jacob Jades.

Chart positions

References

External links
 Official website

2012 debut albums